Changing Stations is a classical-contemporary concept album by British composer Daniel Liam Glyn, released on 28 October 2016 via Caravan Boy Records. The album's first single, "Monday", was released to digital music retailers on 16 September 2016.

Background and release 

Shortly after graduating from The University of Salford, Glyn relocated to London and began seeking inspiration for a collection of new piano pieces to coincide with his neurological condition, Synaesthesia. Glyn soon began to study the London Underground tube map and felt a connection between his Synaesthesia and each of the tube lines colours, and decided to study them in more detail to gain a better understanding of each line and their contrasting atmospheres and type of commuter.

Work on the compositions began in late 2012 and concluded in 2014. The eleven tracks featured on the album are based on each of the London Underground's main tube lines: Bakerloo, Central, Circle, District, Hammersmith and City, Jubilee, Metropolitan, Northern, Piccadilly, Victoria, and Waterloo and City, and are composed in the keys of G minor, A major, C major, F# minor, E major, B major, Ab major, D major, D minor, Bb major and D minor respectively. Each track focuses heavily on the different speeds, sounds, and mood of each line, and are composed in the key signature synaesthetically assigned by Glyn with reference to the colour of the tube line on the map. The thoughts, opinions and descriptions of the London Underground can be heard throughout the record by commuters of the network, along with stories of different events in the city. The recording of the album took place between 2014 and 2015 in both Manchester and London through the use of computers and mobile phones, paying homage to the revolution in technology on the London Underground since its inception. Elements of prepared piano can be heard on several tracks on the record, replicating and imitating the sounds of the train carriages and train tracks in movement. Items such as credit cards, oyster cards, paper money, coins, and tube maps, (all of which are frequently used to travel on the London Underground), were strategically placed between the strings of piano to produce an array of different rhythmic and percussive sounds, drawing inspiration from composers such as John Cage and Maurice Delage who also used this technique.

"Melancholy", the ninth track on the album, is based on the 7th July 2005 terrorist attack on the network's Piccadilly Line, and features a narration by one of the survivors of the attacks. The final track on the album, "The Drain", takes its name from the colloquial term for the Waterloo and City line.

The album was successfully funded through Kickstarter in April 2016 and subsequently released worldwide on 28 October 2016.

In May 2017, every piece from the album was remixed by electronic music producer Damion O'Brien, turning the original compositions into a new collection of Electronica, Ambient House, Nu-disco, and Drum & Bass themed tracks.  The project 'Changing Stations: Derailed' was described by Annabelle Carvell of Synaesthesia Magazine as "injecting a new lease of life into the original classical piano compositions, with the tracklisting re-arranged to form a new 'journey' on the London Underground"

Critical reception 

Barry Adamson from Piccadilly Records described the album as "a beautiful, and conceptually superb suite of plaintive modern-classical utterances and spoken word narration. Somewhere between the grand, filmic post-rock of This Will Destroy You and the soundtrack work of Adam Wiltzie and  Max Richter."  Aliya Ismangil of The Mancunion stated the compositions have "a feel of constant frantic energy from the minor pulsing chords under eerie synth sounds, reflecting the haphazard contrasts of the different stations on a line".  Sam Liddicott from Music Musings & Such defined the album as "unique and highly illuminating music".

Track listing

  signifies an additional producer.

Personnel 
Credits adapted from the liner notes of Changing Stations.

Personnel

 Daniel Liam Glyn – composer , piano , clip recordings, string arrangements , choir arrangements , art direction, visual concept
 Katie Tavini – mastering, producer, recording, audio concept 
 Tom Povall – mixing 
 Laurie Agnew – percussion 
 Sam Wyatt – art direction
 Lucy Ridges – photography, visual concept
 Heather Renshaw – logo design, photography
 Dom&Ink – illustrations

Additional personnel

 Ordsall Acapella Choir – vocals 
 Bjorn Thomassen – voiceover clip 
 Christopher Lunt – voiceover clip 
 David Couzens – voiceover clip 
 James Burrell – voiceover clip 
 Olivia Thomas – voiceover clip 
 Scott Elliott – voiceover clip 
 Sherri Lomas – voiceover clip 
 Vivienne Rudcenko – voiceover clip 
 Will Roberts – voiceover clip 
 Saad Ali – additional production 
 Danny Pheasey – assistant recording engineer 

Changing Stations: Derailed

 Daniel Liam Glyn – composer , piano , string arrangement , art direction, visual concept
 Damion O'Brien – producer, mixing 
 Katie Tavini – mastering 
 Lucy Ridges – photography, visual concept
 Heather Renshaw – art direction, logo design

Release history

References

External links
 Changing Stations

2016 albums
Daniel Liam Glyn albums
Concept albums